This is a list of notable people from Bathurst, New Brunswick. Although not everyone in this list was born in Bathurst, they all live or have lived in Bathurst and have had significant connections to the community. 

This article does not include the List of people from Gloucester County, New Brunswick as they have their own section.

Mayors of Bathurst
This list of mayors of Bathurst may be found in MacMillan (reference below, to 1983) or at the City Hall where the mayoral photographic portrait array is to the left of chambers.

Federal Parliament representation

Members of Parliament for Gloucester County
Timothy Warren Anglin 1867–1882,
 Speaker of the House from March 26, 1874, until February 12, 1879
Kennedy Francis Burns 1882–1893

Senators from the Bathurst subdivision
 John Ferguson 1867–1888
 Kennedy Francis Burns 1893–1895

Other people from Bathurst

See also
List of people from New Brunswick
Boys in Red Tragedy

References

Bibliography

Bathurst, New Brunswick
Bathurst